Competent harbour authorities (CHA) in the United Kingdom are those harbour authorities that have been given statutory powers relating to the provision of pilotage in their waters. The description was created by the Pilotage Act 1987, at which point a CHA had to be one whose harbour was wholly or partly within a pilotage district where at least one act of pilotage had been performed, or where a pilotage exemption certificate had been in force, between 1984 and 1987. However, the act provided a procedure by which other harbour authorities could be assigned CHA status and some harbours have taken advantage of this process. The Marine Navigation Act 2013 amended the Pilotage Act to provide a reverse process, so that harbour authorities could be relieved of CHA status.

Statutory harbour authorities

A statutory harbour authority (SHA) is a different designation which permits harbours to charge dues and remove wrecks, as well as conferring the responsibility to maintain buoys and lighthouses within the area of the harbour. Statutory harbour authorities are regulated under the Harbours Act 1964.

All competent harbour authorities are also statutory harbour authorities.

List of competent harbour authorities

The following are those harbour authorities that are currently identified as CHAs:

England and Wales

 Anglesey Borough Council (Amlwch) 
 Associated British Ports:
 Barrow
 Barry
 Cardiff
 Fleetwood
 Garston
 Humber, Goole and Trent
 King's Lynn
 Lowestoft
 Newport
 Plymouth
 Port Talbot
 Silloth
 Southampton
 Swansea
 Berwick Harbour Commissioners
 Blyth Harbour Commissioners
 Boston Borough Council (joint arrangement with Fosdyke)
 Brightlingsea Harbour Commissioners
 Brighton Marina Company
 Bristol City Docks
 Bristol Port Company
 Broads Authority
 Caernarvon Harbour Trust
 Canterbury City Council (Whitstable)
 Carrick District Council (Falmouth)
 Carmarthenshire Council (Llanelli)
 Cattewater Harbour Commissioners (Plymouth)
 Chichester Harbour Conservancy
 Colchester Borough Council (Colne)
 Cowes Harbour Commissioners
 Crouch Harbour Authority
 Cumbria County Council (Workington)
 Dart Harbour & Navigation Authority
 Duchy of Cornwall (Scilly Isles)
 Dover Harbour Board
 Dwyfor District Council (Portmadoc)
 Environment Agency (Rye)
 Exeter City Council and Exmouth Dock Company (joint arrangement)
 Falmouth Dock Company
 Falmouth Harbour Commissioners
 Felixstowe Dock & Railway Company
 Port of Fosdyke (joint arrangement with Boston)
 Fowey Harbour Commissioners
 Gloucester Harbour Trustees 	
 Great Yarmouth Port Authority
 Harwich Haven Authority
 Isle of Wight Council (Newport)
 Ipswich Port Authority
 King's Lynn Conservancy Board
 Lancaster Port Commission
 Langstone Harbour Board
 Littlehampton Harbour Board
 Port of London Authority
 Looe Harbour Commissioners
 Lymington Harbour Commissioners
 Maldon Harbour Commissioners
 Manchester Ship Canal Company
 Maryport Harbour Authority
 Medway Ports Authority
 Mersey Docks & Harbour Company
 Milford Haven Port Authority
 Mostyn Docks Limited
 Mousehole Harbour Authority
 Neath Harbour Commissioners
 Newlyn Pier & Harbour Commissioners
 Newport Harbour Commissioners
 Padstow Harbour Commissioners
 Penwith District Council
 Poole Harbour Commissioners
 Portland Port Limited
 City of Portsmouth
 Porthleven Harbour & Dock Company
 Sandwich Port & Haven Commissioners
 Scarborough Borough Council (Scarborough & Whitby) (until 10 May 2021)
 Seaham Harbour Dock Company
 Sedgemoor District Council (Bridgwater)
 Shoreham Port Authority
 Stena Harbours:
 Fishguard
 Folkestone 
 Harwich Parkeston Quay
 Heysham 
 Holyhead
 Newhaven
 Sutton Bridge (under Wisbech Harbour Authority Nene Ports)
 Port of Sunderland Authority
 Tees & Hartlepool Port Authority
 Teignmouth Harbour Commissioners
 Teignmouth Quay Company (subsidiary of Associated British Ports)
 Thanet District Council (Ramsgate)
 Torbay Borough Council (Brixham)
 Torridge District Council (Bideford)
 Port of Tyne Authority
 Warkworth Harbour Commissioners
 Waveney District Council (Southwold)
 Wells Harbour Commissioners
 West Dorset District Council (Bridport)
 West Somerset District Council (Watchet)
 Weymouth & Portland Borough Council
 Whitehaven Harbour Commissioners
 Worthing Borough Council
 Wisbech Harbour Authority (Nene Ports)
 Yorkshire Ouse (British Waterways)

Former competent harbour authorities
 Yarmouth Harbour Commissioners was a CHA until 2015 when its pilotage functions were revoked.
 Scarborough Borough Council was a CHA until 10 May 2021 when its pilotage functions were revoked.

Scotland

 Associated British Ports:
 Ayr
 Troon
 Aberdeen Harbour Board
 Clyde Port Authority
 Cromarty Firth Port Authority
 Dumfries and Galloway Council 
 Dundee Port Authority
 Forth Ports Authority
 Fraserburgh Harbour Commissioners
 Inverness Harbour Trust
 Irvine Harbour Company
 Lerwick Harbour Trust
 Montrose Harbour Trust
 Moray Council (Buckie & Burghead)
 Orkney Islands Council
 Peterhead Bay Authority and Trustees of the Harbour of Peterhead (joint arrangement)
 Shetland Islands Council (Sullom Voe & Scalloway)
 Stornoway Pier & Harbour Commission
 Strathclyde Regional Council (Rothesay)
 Wick Harbour Trust

Northern Ireland

 Belfast Harbour Commissioners
 Coleraine Harbour Commissioners
 Londonderry Port & Harbour Commissioners
 Warrenpoint Harbour Authority
 Carlingford Lough Commissioners

References

 "Review of the Pilotage Act 1987" (DETR, 1998) - Appendix C: List of competent harbour authorities

Ports and harbours of the United Kingdom

Harbour
Harbour